Hu Zongnan (16 May 1896 – 14 February 1962), courtesy name Shoushan (壽山), was a Chinese general in the National Revolutionary Army and then the Republic of China Army. Together with Chen Cheng and Tang Enbo, Hu, a native of Zhenhai, Ningbo, formed the triumvirate of Chiang Kai-shek's most trusted generals during the Second Sino-Japanese War.  After the retreat of the Nationalists to Taiwan in 1949, he also served as the President's military strategy advisor until his death in 1962.

Campaigns against warlords 
Hu was in the first graduating class of Whampoa Military Academy (1924). One of Chiang Kai-shek's favourite students, he took part in the Northern Expedition as commander of the 2nd Regiment, 1st Division, First Army. In May 1927 he was promoted to deputy commander of 1st Division while retaining command of 2nd Regiment. In November of the same year he was assigned as commander of the 22nd Division and led the division during the second Northern Expedition in April 1928. In August his division was downsized to the 2nd Brigade of 1st Division, and he served as commander of this brigade which Chiang thought highly of. In 1929 and 1930 he led his brigade in the Central Plains War to defend the central government against the regional warlords such as the Gui clique, Feng Yuxiang and Yan Xishan. He was promoted and given command of a reorganised 1st Division upon his return.

He participated in Chiang's communist extermination campaigns, was given command of First Army in 1936, and took part in the Battle of Shanghai and Wuhan, variously leading the Seventeenth Army, 34th Army Group, 8th Military Region and 1st Military Region.  Hu proved himself in these battles and along with Tang Enbo, Xue Yue, and others, Hu became one of the Kuomintang generals his enemy deeply feared and respected.  However, Hu's glory on the battlefields was short-lived, and much to the delight of his Japanese enemy, Hu nearly vanished after these battles and rarely participated in the rest of war because he was put in charge of more than 400,000 Kuomintang troops by Chiang Kai-shek to blockade the communist base in Shaanxi.  Hu Zongnan would have preferred to die for his country on the battlefields fighting the Japanese invaders, even the communist agents infiltrated his inner circle would have to admit that Hu had shown his eagerness to fight the Japanese from time to time, but as a professional soldier, he dutifully carried out his order given by Chiang Kai-shek by staying at this job for the rest of war.

During this time, Hu's rivalry with Chen Cheng continued while his friendship with Dai Li deepened, leading to Hu's engagement to Ye Xiadi (叶霞翟), who was a Juntong agent working under Dai Li and was introduced to Hu by Dai.  Hu and Ye eventually married in 1948, when Hu was 52, almost two decades Ye's senior.

Resumption of the Chinese Civil War 
After World War II, Hu Zongnan battled the Communist Party of China and in the early stage of the struggle, was once successful in taking Yan'an, the capital of the communist base in Shaanxi.  However, Hu was unable to achieve any further significant victories because out of the original 400,000 troops he once commanded for most part of the war, a great portion was transferred to other commands after the war, leaving only 250,000 for Hu himself at the time.  It was rumored that Hu's rivalries within Kuomintang around Chiang Kai-shek such as Chen Cheng were jealous of him and convinced Chiang to reduce Hu's power. With the death of his close ally Dai Li, there was nobody to defend Hu Zongnan in front of Chiang, and since Hu himself was in the distant land in the remote corner of China busy fighting the communists, he could not abandon his job and go to Chiang to explain himself in the political infighting within the Kuomintang.  Although Hu Zongnan was a capable commander, he was nonetheless not a match for his communist opponent Peng Dehuai, and with the absolute numerical and technical superiorities, Hu's a quarter million troops not only failed to defeat the communist Peng Dehuai's 20,000 strong force, but after their initial success, also continuously suffered numerous defeats that greatly reduced Hu's strength.  The loss of his troops was so great that in March 1950, when Hu retreated to Taiwan, he was by himself and did not have any troops left.

However, it must be said that Hu's defeat had much more to do with his political personality than his military capability.  More importantly, Chiang Kai-shek's overconfidence, political zeal and infatuation with holding on to territory, like Hitler, also contributed greatly to the Kuomintang's failure.  The rugged terrain of the northwestern China favored the communists defenders and their guerrilla warfare and not suitable for the mechanized nationalist troops, a large number of which was needed to defend the newly captured regions.  During Hu Zongnan's initial success, he was able to overrun the communists' base in Shaanxi and forced the communists to evacuate most of their governmental bodies to the east of the Yellow River at a cost of merely losing 20,000 troops out of a quarter million total in the process, but in order to guard the newly conquered vast regions, the nationalist troops were dangerously overstretched and spread thin.  For example, it would take 80,000 troops to capture and guard Yan'an, the former communist capital in Shaanxi, but the political symbolism was simply too much for Chiang Kai-shek and the Kuomintang to forsake, and as a result, political zeal overrode military practicality. Hu Zongnan was aided by Ma Clique Muslim cavalry when seizing Yan'an.

Another lethal curse on Hu Zongnan and his troops was Chiang Kai-shek's infatuation with holding on to the conquered land: the region was simply too large and too rugged to be guarded by any relatively small but highly mobile mechanized force, and thus a large number of troops had to be stationed in the geographically isolated regions to guard these regions. The reasons that such a great force was needed were that the communists' main force was not damaged in any way during the nationalist campaigns and was still able to launch assaults on the nationalists, and Chiang Kai-shek's overconfidence caused him to believe that the 20,000 strong communist main force engaged in guerrilla warfare in its former base was not a threat, which proved to be fatally wrong.  In order to achieve what Chiang had wished, a force much larger than 400,000 were needed, and 230,000 troops Hu had under his command certainly was not enough to do the job.

The American Time magazine claimed Hu beat his chest like Tarzan when he was frustrated or angry. In March, 1948, at Ichuan Peng Dehuai led Communist forces to launch a surprise attack against Hu Zongnan's forces, inflicting 20,000 casualties upon them, and drove all the way with 60,000 soldiers into southern Shaanxi province to reach Sichuan, General Hu requested immediate help from Muslim Governor Ma Hongkui, who sent two Muslim cavalry divisions. They defeated the Communist forces at Pao-chi and inflicted 20,000 dead upon the Communists, expelling them into Gansu.

In 1949 the entire Kuomintang defences were falling apart. General Hu Zongnan ignored President Li Zongren's orders, and the Muslim General Ma Hongkui was furious at this. Hu also did not honor promises to Ma Hongkui and the other Muslim Ma Clique Generals. Ma Hongkui sent a telegram to Li Zongren to submit his resignation from all positions he held, then Ma Hongkui fled to Taiwan, and his cousin Ma Hongbin took charge of his positions.

Legacy 

Hu Zongnan, as a capable military commander was not unaware of these problems the nationalists had faced, but as a loyal subject of this superior, Hu could not challenge Chiang Kai-shek, especially when such actions would provide the false impression of him being holding and expanding his own power, leading the way to become a new warlord, since he was already being called the Northwestern King not only by the communists, but also his rivalries within the Kuomintang itself.  Therefore, Hu faithfully obeyed his orders given by Chiang Kai-shek and did not offer any opposition when his force was drastically reduced even though it needed to be greatly boosted if Chiang Kai-shek's intentions to be carried out, and eventually ended up in the inevitable defeats:  it was merely after losing only a little more than 13,000 troops out of the total 230,000 in the three battles, the nationalists offensives in the former communist base had effectively ended because there was not enough troops to guard every newly conquered region and launching assaults on the communist main force at the same time.  The communists were able to rest and regroup after these three battles and capitalize on this stalemate, eventually turning the table on the nationalist by decimating the Kuomintang force gradually, one small chunk at a time.  Although Chiang Kai-shek would send Hu Zongnan reinforcement which was eventually greater than what Hu had commanded during World War II, it did not help Hu's situation because such reinforcement was sent in small numbers one at a time, thus a decisive blow to the communist main force could not be launched with numerical and technical superiority in a single strike.  In contrast, the communists were able to concentrate their force to launch decisive blows to every nationalist garrison they engaged every time by achieving numerical superiority, taking out the Kuomintang units gradually.  Hu Zongnan's failure was large not due to his military capability, but he was blamed by his rivals afterward. Another reason for Hu's failure was because that his most trusted assistant, Major General Xiong Xianghui was a communist spy.  Xiong secretly joined communist party in December 1936 at Tsinghua University and under the direct order of Zhou Enlai, Xiong went to work for Hu Zongnan in December 1937.  Xiong excelled in his work and since March 1939, he had become Hu's most trusted subordinate and named Xiong his secretary, a position Xiong held until May, 1947, when he was sent to USA by Hu Zongnan to study.  It was not after Xiong left Hu did Hu discovered Xiong's true identity, and obviously, it was not Hu Zongnan's fault and Hu himself was fooled and thus a victim as well, but Hu's political enemy, such as those in Chen Cheng's camp, accused him of harboring communists, a charge later resurfaced after the nationalist had withdrawn to Taiwan, and Hu was cleared for both times. After the KMT fled to Taiwan, he served as governor of Zhejiang (Chekiang) from 1952, commanded the ROC defense in the First Taiwan Strait Crisis and retired from the army in 1955. He went on to serve as the President's military strategy advisor until his death on 14 February 1962.

References 

Ministry of National Defense R.O.C 
 Generals of World War II   http://www.generals.dk/
US Naval War College
 https://web.archive.org/web/20090326011824/http://cgsc.leavenworth.army.mil/carl/download/csipubs/bjorge_huai.pdf

External links 
 胡宗南
 Biography of General Hu Tsung-nan

Chinese military personnel of World War II
National Revolutionary Army generals from Zhejiang
1896 births
1962 deaths
Politicians from Ningbo
Kuomintang politicians in Taiwan
Whampoa Military Academy alumni
People of the Northern Expedition
Recipients of the Order of Blue Sky and White Sun
Republic of China politicians from Zhejiang
Chinese Civil War refugees
Taiwanese people from Zhejiang
Chinese anti-communists